Lindemans may refer to:

Lindemans Brewery in Belgium
Lindeman's, an Australian winery
Christiaan Lindemans (1912-1946), World War II Dutch double agent who worked for the Nazis

See also
Lindeman (disambiguation)